Alejandro Alberto Carlos Páez y Aragón is a Mexican politician affiliated with the National Action Party (PAN).

Páez is a graduate of Stanford Graduate School of Business. He served as municipal president (mayor) of San Pedro Garza García from 2003 to 2006. In August 2006 Governor Natividad González designated Páez as Secretary of Economic Development but took office until November 2006.

References

Living people
Politicians from Nuevo León
Municipal presidents in Nuevo León
National Action Party (Mexico) politicians
Year of birth missing (living people)
Stanford Graduate School of Business alumni
Phillips Academy alumni
21st-century Mexican politicians